Dorcadion tibiale is a species of beetle in the family Cerambycidae. It was described by Jakovlev in 1890. It is known from China and Central Asia.

See also 
 Dorcadion

References

tibiale
Beetles described in 1890